The 1920 United States presidential election in Idaho took place on November 2, 1920, as part of the 1920 United States presidential election. State voters chose four representatives, or electors, to the Electoral College, who voted for president and vice president.

Background
At state level, Idaho had begun in 1902 to be very much a one-party Republican state, which it has largely remained since apart from the New Deal era of the 1930s and 1940s. For a time there was also a perception that the William Jennings Bryan-led Democratic Party had failed as a “party of reform”.

However, with the aid of a powerful “peace vote” due to opposition to participation in World War I, and a considerable part of the substantial vote for Eugene Debs, Woodrow Wilson almost completely swept the Western and Plains States in 1916, losing only South Dakota and Oregon.

However, the Democratic Party’s gains in the West were not to last. By the beginning of 1920 skyrocketing inflation and Wilson's focus upon his proposed League of Nations at the expense of domestic policy had helped make the incumbent President very unpopular – besides which Wilson also had major health problems that had left First Lady Edith effectively running the nation. Political unrest seen in the Palmer Raids and the "Red Scare" further added to the unpopularity of the Democratic Party, since this global political turmoil produced considerable fear of alien revolutionaries invading the country. Demand in the West for exclusion of Asian immigrants became even stronger than before.

With the very strong interior isolationist and anti-League of Nations sentiment of Northern and Central Idaho, and local senator William Borah saying that all wars should be subject to a referendum in September, it was apparent that the Gem State would swing very strongly against the pro-League Cox, especially as the extremely independent Borah endorsed Harding on October 3. Cox did make a brief visit to the state in mid-September,  The state’s opposition to Cox’s platform became further apparent when on October 24 the Democratic nominee said he did not accept that Congress should be able to veto presidential calls for war against foreign countries.

Vote
As early as the end of August, Harding campaign strategists led by Washington State Senator Miles Poindexter were saying Cox’s pro-League policies would lose him the West. a straw poll at the beginning of October vindicated Poindexter: Harding led Cox in Idaho by slightly less than a two-to-one margin. At the end of October, Idaho was described as “absolutely certain” for Harding, and such polls reflected the end result. Whereas internationalist GOP nominee Charles Evans Hughes won just five counties in 1916, Harding carried every Idaho county by double digits.

Results

Results by county

See also
 United States presidential elections in Idaho

Notes

References

Idaho
1920
1920 Idaho elections